France participated at the 2017 Summer Universiade, in Taipei, Taiwan.

Medal summary

Medal by sports

References

 France Overview

External links
Universiade Taipei 2017 

Nations at the 2017 Summer Universiade
2017
2017 in French sport